San Jose Church, formally known as San José de Placer Church, is a Roman Catholic church in Iloilo City, Philippines. It was built in 1607 by the Jesuits and is considered the first ever church in the city of Iloilo. The church houses the replica of Santo Niño de Cebú, the patron saint of the Dinagyang Festival. It is located in what was once known as Plaza Alfonso XII, now Plaza Libertad, a historic plaza in Iloilo City.

History 
The first church in Iloilo, whose name back then was La Punta, was erected by the Jesuits in 1607, primarily as a support for the military in the area. On April 29, 1617, the Augustinians came and established a house of the order which they named "San José." They held San Jose Church until 1775, when governance was handed over to the secular clergy.

By 1873, the church of San Jose went through a renovation, essentially bolstering on what the Jesuits had already built, and is the same church being seen to this day. In line with the church’s needed overhaul, a nearby convent was also established.

During World War II, the church was saved from being bombed by the Americans after they received information that the Japanese were not holed up in the church as they were previously informed. Between 1980 and 1982, the church was renovated and a new marble floor was laid, under the direction of the poet-writer, Fr. Gilbert Centina. San Jose Church is one of the few parishes in the Philippines still under the Augustinians.

Architecture 
San Jose Church adheres to the Renaissance design, fused with Hellenic elements. In support of the central nave is an arcade of Corinthian pillars. The church is designed to resemble the Latin Cross, with the exception of a dome at the center. The church's interior has an arcade of Corinthian columns supporting a faux barrel vault over the nave and groin vaults over the aisle. The main altar has some Gothic touches. An image of the Nuestra Senora del Rosario can also be found in the church, which was discovered by Diego Quinnes during the Dutch siege of Iloilo on September 29, 1614.

References

External links 

Roman Catholic churches in Iloilo
Spanish Colonial architecture in the Philippines
Buildings and structures in Iloilo City
Tourist attractions in Iloilo City
Churches in the Roman Catholic Archdiocese of Jaro